The Democratic Republic of Vietnam national football team was the national team of the Democratic Republic of Vietnam (commonly known as North Vietnam) from 1954 to 1976. It existed side by side with a separate South Vietnam team, which represented the French-controlled southern portion of Vietnam. Unlike South Vietnam (which was a member of both FIFA and the Asian Football Confederation), North Vietnam's lack of diplomatic recognition on the part of many other states prevented it from ever joining either FIFA or the AFC. Due to its lack of membership in major football bodies, North Vietnam never participated in qualification for the FIFA World Cup or the AFC Asian Cup (unlike its southern counterpart, which participated in both). Because of North Vietnam's international isolation, its national team mostly played against other Communist and Communist-sympathizing countries during its relatively brief existence. 

The North Vietnam football team ceased to exist with the unification of North and South Vietnam into the newly-created Socialist Republic of Vietnam in 1976, after the end of the Vietnam War. Even though the North emerged victorious in the war, the current Vietnam national football team is considered a successor to the South Vietnam team (not the North Vietnam team), since unified Vietnam inherited South Vietnam's membership of FIFA and the AFC.

History

North Vietnam's first international match was against China in 1956. North Vietnam's head coach, Truong Tan Buu, played a 3-2-5 (WM) formation but the game ended in a 3-5 defeat. The team recorded their first victory in 1960 with a 3-1 win against Mongolia. 

Since the North Vietnam football team was not recognized by international federations such as FIFA, the AFC, or the International Olympic Committee, the only international competition it ever took part in was the football tournament of the Games of the New Emerging Forces (GANEFO), whose organizing body was friendlier toward the Democratic Republic of Vietnam. North Vietnam proved to be a relatively strong side in the GANEFO competition, finishing fourth in the 1963 edition and third in the 1966 edition. It also earned third place in the football-only GANEFO event that took place in 1965.

Immediately after Vietnamese reunification in 1976, both the North and South Vietnam teams ceased to exist. The now unified Socialist Republic of Vietnam inherited former South Vietnam's place in FIFA and the AFC, but Vietnam would not field an international football team again until the 1990s.

Kit
The home kit of North Vietnam was similar to the kit of the Soviet Union consisting of a red shirt with "VIET NAM DCCH" across the front, white shorts and white-red socks.

The goalkeeper's kit was a black shirt with a white collar, black shorts and socks.

Head coaches
 Truong Tan Buu

Competitive record

World Cup record

Asian Cup record

GANEFO

Head-to-head records

The list shown below shows the North Vietnam national football team all-time international record against opposing nations.

Key

Match results 
This is a list of the North Vietnam national football team results.

Results

See also
 Football in Vietnam

References

 
Former national association football teams in Asia